Dalea lasiathera, the purple prairieclover, is a plant from the Southwestern United States.

Uses
Among the Zuni people, the root of is chewed as candy, especially by children. Flowers are crushed by hand and sprinkled into meat stew as a flavoring after cooking.

References

lasiathera
Flora of the Southwestern United States
Flora of New Mexico
Plants used in Native American cuisine
Spices
Plants described in 1852
Taxa named by Asa Gray